Oketo is a city in Marshall County, Kansas, United States.  As of the 2020 census, the population of the city was 64.

History
Oketo was incorporated as a city in 1870. It was named for a chief of the Otoe tribe.

The first post office in Oketo was established in May 1873.

Geography
Oketo is located at  (39.962882, -96.598896).

Demographics

2010 census
As of the census of 2010, there were 66 people, 31 households, and 19 families residing in the city. The racial makeup of the city was 100.0% White. Hispanic or Latino of any race were 1.5% of the population.

There were 31 households, of which 29.0% had children under the age of 18 living with them, 48.4% were married couples living together, 3.2% had a female householder with no husband present, 9.7% had a male householder with no wife present, and 38.7% were non-families. 38.7% of all households were made up of individuals, and 19.4% had someone living alone who was 65 years of age or older. The average household size was 2.13 and the average family size was 2.68.

The median age in the city was 46.5 years. 22.7% of residents were under the age of 18; 4.5% were between the ages of 18 and 24; 15.1% were from 25 to 44; 34.8% were from 45 to 64; and 22.7% were 65 years of age or older. The gender makeup of the city was 51.5% male and 48.5% female.

2000 census
As of the census of 2000, there were 87 people, 41 households, and 28 families residing in the city. The racial makeup of the city was 95.40% White, and 4.60% from two or more races.

There were 41 households, out of which 24.4% had children under the age of 18 living with them, 61.0% were married couples living together, 7.3% had a female householder with no husband present, and 31.7% were non-families. 29.3% of all households were made up of individuals, and 12.2% had someone living alone who was 65 years of age or older. The average household size was 2.12 and the average family size was 2.57.

In the city, the population was spread out, with 20.7% under the age of 18, 2.3% from 18 to 24, 29.9% from 25 to 44, 23.0% from 45 to 64, and 24.1% who were 65 years of age or older. The median age was 44 years. For every 100 females, there were 112.2 males. For every 100 females age 18 and over, there were 97.1 males.

The median income for a household in the city was $26,667, and the median income for a family was $30,893. Males had a median income of $26,042 versus $20,833 for females. The per capita income for the city was $16,862. There were 8.7% of families and 9.5% of the population living below the poverty line, including no under eighteens and none of those over 64.

Education
The community is served by Marysville USD 364 public school district.

Notable people
 Thomas Olmsted, Roman Catholic bishop

References

Further reading

External links
  
 Oketo - Directory of Public Officials
 Oketo city map, KDOT

Cities in Kansas
Cities in Marshall County, Kansas